Smiths Ferry is a census-designated place in Valley County, Idaho, United States. Its population was 75 as of the 2010 census.

A ferry at the river was established by Clinton Meyers in 1887 to transport livestock to summer pasture in the Round and Long Valleys across the river. Also popular with freighters, the ferry was sold by Meyers to Jim Smith in 1891, hence the name Smith's Ferry.

Demographics

Highway
 - SH-55  to  Boise (south) and McCall (north)

Smiths Ferry sits along State Highway 55, the primary north–south route out of Boise, It was designated the "Payette River Scenic Byway" in 1977.

References

External links
Idaho Transportation Department   webcam of Highway 55 at Smiths Ferry
Visit Idaho.org   Payette River Scenic Byway
You Tube - video - Hwy 55, Smiths Ferry Dr to Rainbow Bridge, Idaho

Census-designated places in Valley County, Idaho
Census-designated places in Idaho